Tazehabad-e Dulkoru (also Romanized as Tāzehābād-e Dūlkorū; also known as Tāzehābād-e Sar-e Pol) is a village in Avalan Rural District, Muchesh District, Kamyaran County, Kurdistan Province, Iran. At the 2006 census, its population was 79, in 19 families. The village is populated by Kurds.

References 

Towns and villages in Kamyaran County
Kurdish settlements in Kurdistan Province